The 2010 Chivas USA season was the sixth season of the team's existence.

Season review

Transfers

In

Out

Roster

Management

North American SuperLiga

Competitions

MLS

League table

Results summary

Results

U.S. Open Cup

Statistics

Appearances and goals

|-
|colspan="14"|Players away from Chivas USA on loan:

|-
|colspan="14"|Players who left Chivas USA during the season:

|}

Goal scorers

Disciplinary Record

References

External links

Chivas USA seasons
Chivas USA
Chivas USA
Chivas USA